General elections were held in Saint Helena on 26 July 2017. A total of 17 candidates contested the elections.

Electoral system
The 12 seats in the Legislative Council were elected by plurality-at-large voting, with voters allowed to cast up to 12 votes. Eight polling stations were opened for voting.

Results

References

Elections in Saint Helena
Saint Helena
Saint Helena
2017 in Saint Helena
July 2017 events in Africa
Non-partisan elections